The Big Durian is a large public work of art. It is located at the centre of the roundabout in Kampot, Cambodia. The statue recognises the historic durian industry in Kampot, which was devastated by the Khmer Rouge.

References 

Sculptures
Kampot province